Jason Hyrum Steffen (born May 15, 1975) is an American astrophysicist and assistant professor of physics and astronomy at the University of Nevada, Las Vegas (UNLV). He is also a member of the science team for NASA's Kepler mission. He worked at Fermilab and Northwestern University for a decade before joining the UNLV faculty. He is known for his work on the discoveries of several exoplanets. He has also developed an alternative method for boarding passengers onto commercial aircraft, known as the Steffen Boarding Method. It has been found to be significantly faster than the "back-to-front" method used by most commercial airlines. He was inspired to begin research on the topic after waiting in an exceptionally long line to board a plane at an airport. He also hosts a stream on the streaming service, Twitch, by the name of horizonSci.

References

External links
Faculty page

Living people
1975 births
People from Fairfield, California
American astrophysicists
University of Nevada, Las Vegas faculty
Weber State University alumni
University of Washington alumni
20th-century American physicists